Saalfelder Höhe is a former municipality in the district Saalfeld-Rudolstadt, in Thuringia, Germany. Since July 2018, it is a part (Ortsteil) of the town Saalfeld, consisting of 17 villages.

References

Former municipalities in Thuringia
Saalfeld-Rudolstadt